Int Khedichhap is a village in the Bhopal district of Madhya Pradesh, India. It is located in the Huzur tehsil. It is located on the south-western shore of the Upper Lake.

Demographics 

According to the 2011 census of India, Int Khedichhap has 154 households. The effective literacy rate (i.e. the literacy rate of population excluding children aged 6 and below) is 77.25%.

References 

Villages in Huzur tehsil